Hugh Howard (1731 – 27 October 1799) was an Anglo-Irish politician.

He served in the Irish House of Commons as the Member of Parliament for St Johnstown between 1769 and 1783.

References

1731 births
1799 deaths
18th-century Anglo-Irish people
Hugh
Irish MPs 1769–1776
Irish MPs 1776–1783
Members of the Parliament of Ireland (pre-1801) for County Donegal constituencies